Muná is a small city in Muna Municipality, Yucatán State, Mexico, to the south of the state capital of Mérida at 20.48°N, 89.72°W. Muná had an estimated population of about 11,000 people in 2003. Muna is north of the Maya ruins of Uxmal.

The Iglesia De Muna church dates to the 16th century. Muna's Carnaval is celebrated throughout town in August and April.  During the celebration dances, bullfights, and many festivities are held.

Populated places in Yucatán